Jesus de Greatest is a statue of Jesus Christ located in Abajah village in Imo State, Nigeria. It is considered "Africa’s largest statue of Jesus", and is the fifth tallest statue on the African continent. The 160 foot African Renaissance Monument is the tallest statue in Africa, the 66 foot Great Sphinx of Giza is second, the 30 foot Statue of Ramesses II is third, and the 28 foot Nelson Mandela statue is fourth. Jesus de Greatest is not the tallest statue of Jesus in the world; that is Jesus Buntu Burake in Indonesia, which is 120 feet taller.

It stands barefoot with both arms outstretched, and was carved out of white marble. It was unveiled on January 1, 2016. Mass was held at St. Aloysius Catholic Church, Abajah with the presiding of the bishop of Orlu Catholic Diocese, Ret. Rev. Augustine Ukwuoma with hundreds of Roman Catholic priests and worshippers, and the unveiling of the statue was held on New Year's Day. 

Obinna Onuoha, a 43-year-old businessman, commissioned the building of the statue in 2013. He explained that he had a dream in 1997 to build a giant statue of Jesus.

See also 
 List of statues of Jesus
 List of statues by height

References 

Tourist attractions in Imo State
Statues of Jesus
2015 establishments in Nigeria